Holcosus orcesi, also known commonly as Peters' ameiva, is a species of lizard in the family Teiidae. The species is endemic to Ecuador.

Etymology
The specific name, orcesi, is in honor of Ecuadorian herpetologist Gustavo Orcés.

Habitat

Reproduction
H. orcesi is oviparous.

References

Further reading
Harvey, Michael B.; Ugueto, Gabriel N.; Gutberlet, Ronald L., Jr. (2012). "Review of Teiid Morphology with a Revised Taxonomy and Phylogeny of the Teiidae (Lepidosauria: Squamata)". Zootaxa 3459: 1–156. (Holcosus orcesi, new combination, p. 123).
Peters, James A. (1964). "The Lizard Genus Ameiva in Ecuador". Bulletin of the Southern California Academy of Sciences 63 (3): 113–127. (Ameiva orcesi, new species, pp. 123–126).

orcesi
Reptiles described in 1964
Taxa named by James A. Peters